Diaphania costata, the orange-shouldered sherbet moth or erroneously the white palpita moth, is a moth of the family Crambidae. The species was first described by Johan Christian Fabricius in 1794. It is widely dispersed, being found in the Indomalayan realm, as well as Europe. It is also found in Mexico and Texas, possibly having been introduced accidentally.

It is a small moth (less than 20 mm wingspan) with translucent white wings, and a gold line on the front edge of the forewing.

External links

"Stemorrhages costata (Fabricius, 1794)". Insecta.pro. Retrieved February 5, 2020.

Moths described in 1794
Diaphania
Moths of Asia